Edward Asbury O'Neal (September 20, 1818 – November 7, 1890) was a Confederate officer during the American Civil War and the 26th Governor of Alabama.

Early life and career
O'Neal was born in Madison County, Alabama, to Edward and Rebecca Wheat O'Neal. His father was a native of Ireland, and his mother was a South Carolinian of French Huguenot ancestry. O'Neal's father died when his son was three months old. After receiving an academic education, including English literature and the classics, O'Neal graduated from LaGrange College (the predecessor of the University of North Alabama) in 1836 at the top of his class with a bachelor of arts. In 1838, he married Olivia Moore, the daughter of Dr. Alfred Moore, and they had nine children. O'Neal studied law with James W. McClung and was admitted to the bar in 1840.

In 1841 O'Neal was elected to Alabama's fourth judicial circuit to fill out an unexpired term and served four years. He strongly believed in secession and advocated that Alabama should secede from the United States during the secession crisis of 1860.

Civil War
In June 1861, O'Neal was commissioned as a captain and commanded three companies of soldiers. Upon reaching Richmond, he was appointed major of the 9th Regiment Alabama Infantry and was promoted to lieutenant colonel in the fall. In March 1862, he was appointed colonel of the 26th Alabama infantry; he commanded this regiment during the Peninsula Campaign. At the Battle of Seven Pines, his horse was killed under him, and a shell fragment severely wounded him. He received high praise for his performance at the Battle of Chancellorsville. In 1863, he commanded a brigade in Maj. Gen. Robert E. Rodes's division, and led it at the Battle of Gettysburg, Battle of Manassas Gap, and at the Battle of Mine Run. Early in 1864, his regiment was sent back to Alabama to recruit its depleted ranks but was quickly ordered to Dalton, Georgia, where O'Neal took command of Brig. Gen. James Cantey's brigade in the Army of Tennessee. O'Neal commanded this brigade during the remainder of the Atlanta Campaign. After Lt. Gen. John Bell Hood was given command of the Army of Tennessee, O'Neal was relieved and served on detached duty for the remainder of the war. He was appointed brigadier general on June 6, 1863. However, this appointment was held up by Gen. Robert E. Lee. The promotion was canceled by Confederate President Jefferson Davis.

Postbellum career
After the war, O'Neal resumed his law career. In August 1875, he was elected to the Alabama Constitutional Convention and served in that convention as chairman of the Committee on Education. In 1880, O'Neal was an elector on the Winfield Scott Hancock campaign for president and made speeches throughout the state advocating Hancock's election. O'Neal served as the Democratic governor of Alabama from 1882 to 1886.

Death and legacy
O'Neal died in Florence, Alabama. His son, Emmet O'Neal, followed in his footsteps and served two terms as Governor of Alabama from 1911 to 1915. The O'Neal Bridge, spanning the Tennessee River between Florence and Sheffield, Alabama, is named in his honor.

See also
List of American Civil War Generals (Acting Confederate)

Notes

References
 Brown, William Garrott, and Albert James Pickett. A History of Alabama, for Use in Schools: Based as to Its Earlier Parts on the Work of Albert J. Pickett. New York: University Publishing Co., 1900. .
 Eicher, John H., and David J. Eicher, Civil War High Commands. Stanford: Stanford University Press, 2001. .
 McDonald, William Lindsey. Walk Through the Past - People and Places of Florence and Lauderdale County, Alabama. Killen, AL: Heart of Dixie Publishing, 2003. .
 Sifakis, Stewart. Who Was Who in the Civil War. New York: Facts On File, 1988. .
 Warner, Ezra J. Generals in Gray: Lives of the Confederate Commanders. Baton Rouge: Louisiana State University Press, 1959. .
 White, J. T. National Cyclopaedia of American Biography. New York: J. T. White, 1900.
 National Governors Association biography

1818 births
1890 deaths
University of North Alabama alumni
Confederate States Army officers
Governors of Alabama
People of Alabama in the American Civil War
Politicians from Huntsville, Alabama
Democratic Party governors of Alabama
American people of Irish descent
19th-century American politicians
Military personnel from Huntsville, Alabama
American Fire-Eaters